Pran Kishore Kaul is a Kashmiri stage personality.  In addition to acting, he has directed and written screenplays.  He was bestowed from the Sahitya Akademi Award for his novel Sheen Tu Watu Pod.  He was one of the founders of the Miltsar Kashmir Music & Dance Group, a group that travels widely with the goal of supporting Kashmiri and Indian arts.

Pran Kishore Kaul is best known as the creator of 1991 Doordarshan television serial Gul Gulshan Gulfaam. In 2018, Kaul was awarded with the civilian award Padma Shri.

References 

Kashmiri people
Living people
Recipients of the Padma Shri in arts
Year of birth missing (living people)
Recipients of the Sahitya Akademi Award in Kashmiri